Kothuku Nanappan (12 March 1935 – 26 December 1994) was an Indian theater actor, mimicry artist and film actor in Malayalam movies during the 1980s and 1990s. His popular movies are Naadodikkaattu (1987), Aanaval Mothiram (1991), Sarapanjaram (1979), Paavam Poornima (1984) and Chenkol (1993). His role as a supervisor role in the comedy film Nadodikattu (1987) is well noted for his performance.

Personal life
He was born to Saraswathy Antharjanam and G. Shankaran Namboothiri, of Muttathu Madom, Perunna, Changanassery, Travancore, on 12 March 1935. His official name was S. Narayanan Namboothiri.  He had a diploma in Textile Technology from Govt. Polytechnic, Thiruvananthapuram. He worked as a Textile Investigator Textile Commissioner’s Office, Mumbai. Later he came back to Kerala to act in movies. He is married to Suseela Devi from Kizhakkedathu House, Varanad, Cherthala in 1962. The couple had two sons. He died on 26 December 1994 on Thiruvananthapuram, Kerala.

Partial filmography
 Lisa (1978)
 Lava (1980)
 Padayottam (1982)
 John Jaffer Janardhanan (1982)
 Aa Raathri (1983)
 Parannu Parannu Parannu (1984)
 Paavam Poornima (1984)
 Aarodum Parayaruthu (Kurutham Kettavan) (1985)
 Kayyum Thalayum Purathidaruthu (1985) 
 Dheem Tharikida Thom (1986)
 Nandi Veendum Varika (1986)
 T. P. Balagopalan M A (1986)
 Mazha Peyyunnu Maddalam Kottunnu (1986)
 Ithile Iniyum Varu (1986)... Joseph
 Nadodikattu (1987) ...  Office Staff
 Asthikal Pookkunnu (1989)
 Kadathanadan Ambadi (1990) ... Beeran
 Aanavaal Mothiram (1991)
 Nettipattom (1991) ... Peethambaran's uncle
 Chenkol'' (1993)

References

 blogspot.in

External links

Male actors from Kottayam
Male actors in Malayalam cinema
Indian male film actors
1935 births
1994 deaths
20th-century Indian male actors
Indian male stage actors